Toini Mathilda Topelius (March 14, 1854 Helsinki, Finland – October 24, 1910 Ljan, Norway) was a Finland-Swedish journalist and writer for young people.

Life
Her parents were writer Zacharias Topelius and Emilie Lindqvist. 
With her sister Eva she attended Svenska fruntimmersskolan (a school for Swedish-speaking female pupils), and then studied art in Stockholm. 
Topelius suffered from impaired hearing and devoted herself mainly to literary themes in her painting.

She published , a Swedish children's magazine, with Alexandra Gripenberg in the years 1885–1892 and 1891–1892 in Alta Dahlgren. 
In Finnish she also published Waxwing magazine. 
She published travel letters and served as reviewer of children's books. 
Her novel  (1889) was first published in Finnish. She also published collections of fairy tales.

In the late 1890s Topelius moved to Norway, where she lived for the rest of her years.

Works
 . 1889 (under the pseudonym Tea; Finnish title , Otava 1890)
, by Tea. Edlund, Helsinki 1889
. Edlund, Helsinki 1892 (Finnish title , Otava 1893)
. Helsinki 1892
. Bonnier, Stockholm 1897 (Finnish title , WSOY 1898)
. Bonnier, Stockholm 1900

References

External links
 

1854 births
1910 deaths
Writers from Helsinki
People from Uusimaa Province (Grand Duchy of Finland)
Finnish writers in Swedish
19th-century Finnish writers
Finnish emigrants to Norway
Swedish-speaking Finns